Tabler may refer to:

People
P. Dempsey Tabler (1876–1956), an American singer, athlete, businessman, and actor
William B. Tabler (1914–2004), an American architect, and his son, William B. Tabler, Jr.
Pat Tabler (born 1958), an American baseball player and commentator

Other uses
Tabler, Oklahoma, an unincorporated community in eastern Grady County, Oklahoma
Tablers, an American soccer team active from 1927 to 1931

See also
Strode-Morrison-Tabler House and Farm, a historic home in West Virginia
Table (disambiguation)